The National Bank of Tajikistan is the central bank of Tajikistan.

The Bank is engaged in developing policies to promote financial inclusion and is a member of the Alliance for Financial Inclusion. Deposits in the National Bank of Tajikistan during the first half of 2013 were $1.09 million, an increase of more than 17% compared to the same period in 2012. The National bank has been well known locally to only have family of the president in the senior positions, and as result has led to nepotism and funding directed for the family of the president.

Chairmen
Tukhtaboy Gafarov, 1991 - 1992
Kayum Kavmiddinov, May 1992 - 1996
Murodali Alimardon, December 1996 - January 2008
Sharif Rahimzoda, January 2008 - January 2012
Abdujabbor Shirinov, January 2012 - May 2015
Jamshed Nurmahmadzoda, May 2015 - November 2020
Hokim Kholiqzoda, November 2020 -

See also

Economy of Tajikistan
Tajik somoni

References

External links
  

 
Tajikistan
Banks established in 1991
1991 establishments in Tajikistan
Banks of Tajikistan